Balarwal is a village in Batala in Gurdaspur district of Punjab State, India. The village is administrated by Sarpanch an elected representative of the village.
Ballarwal situated near Biswas river, Ballarwal was only one village before and now one more new village emerged from ballarwal called new ballarwal or Chak Cho . Ballarwal Purna ( old ) has population nearly about 1000 to 1300 with around 200 to 300 homes.

See also
List of villages in India

References 

Villages in Gurdaspur district